The 1983 Florida State Seminoles football team represented Florida State University in the 1983 NCAA Division I-A football season. The team was coached by Bobby Bowden and played their home games at Doak Campbell Stadium.

Schedule

Game summaries

Miami (FL)

at Florida

vs. North Carolina (Peach Bowl)

References

Florida State
Florida State Seminoles football seasons
Peach Bowl champion seasons
Florida State Seminoles football